East Milton is an unincorporated community and census-designated place in Santa Rosa County, Florida, United States. Its population was 11,074 as of the 2010 census. As its name indicates, the community is located on the east bank of the Blackwater River opposite Milton, and to the north of Navarre.

Geography

References

Unincorporated communities in Santa Rosa County, Florida
Unincorporated communities in Florida
Census-designated places in Santa Rosa County, Florida
Census-designated places in Florida